The Maupin Windrose is an American high-wing, single-seat glider and motor glider that was designed by Jim Maupin for the Sailplane Homebuilders Association Design Contest.

Design and development
Maupin designed the Windrose as an easy-to-construct, safe, self-launching, low-cost and aesthetically pleasing aircraft project that could be flown as a pure glider or a powered glider.

The design has many innovative features and is of mixed construction using wood, foam and fiberglass. The wing is carved from solid foam and covered in fiberglass. There is no spar and instead the wing employs bands of unidirectional roving epoxied under the outer skin and joined by vertical dowels to take the compression loads from the underlying foam. The wing is of a  span or, optionally, a  span, and uses an Irv Culver custom airfoil. The ailerons are controlled from their inboard ends and there are no control runs inside the wings, which are solid.

The fuselage is built around a hollow plywood box structure that supports the wing, landing gear, cockpit and the optional Cuyuna 430  engine. The cockpit shell is made from fiberglass. A single triangular spoiler for glidepath control is mounted in the fuselage roof, above the wing center section. Both the vertical stabilizer and the horizontal stabilizer are all-flying surfaces.

Operational history
At least 14 aircraft were completed in the USA. As of July 2011 five remain on the Federal Aviation Administration registry, including four gliders and one motorglider, which is owned by the designer. All are registered in the Experimental - Amateur-built category.

Variants
Windrose glider
Unpowered version with a  empty weight and a  gross weight, first flown in June 1983.
Windrose motor glider
Powered version with a  empty weight and a  gross weight, first flown in 1984.

Specifications (Windrose glider)

See also

References

External links
Photo of Windrose motorglider

1980s United States sailplanes
Homebuilt aircraft
Aircraft first flown in 1983